Robert Files Lopez (March 31, 1857 – September 20, 1936) was an officer in the United States Navy. He entered Annapolis with the Class of 1879, and he became the first Hispanic-American to graduate from the United States Naval Academy.

Biography
Lopez served as an ensign aboard the  during a voyage of exploration around Alaska in 1888–89. Lopez Point on Herschel Island was named in his honor by the commander of Thetis, Charles Stockton.

The highlight of his 32-year naval career, was his service under Admiral Dewey's command at the first major engagement of the Spanish–American War, the Battle of Manila Bay in 1898.

Shortly after the war ended, Lopez became a plankowner of the torpedo boat USS Rowan (TB-8) when she was commissioned on 1 April 1899.

Following his assignment to Rowan, Lopez commanded the destroyer  from 1904 to 1906.

Captain Lopez's last posting before retirement was as senior member of a naval board which conducted a general survey of vessels on the Pacific coast. He retired as a Commodore (Rear Admiral) in 1911.

Upon America's entry into World War I in 1917, Lopez was recalled to duty as acting commandant of the Mare Island Naval Shipyard, located northeast of San Francisco.

Commodore Lopez died in Alameda, California after a year's illness at the age of 77.

Awards
Dewey Medal
Spanish Campaign Medal
Philippine Campaign Medal
Victory Medal

Dates of rank
Cadet Midshipman - 29 September 1874
Midshipman - 10 June 1881
Ensign (junior grade) - 3 March 1883
Ensign - 26 June 1884
Lieutenant (junior grade) - 16 April 1892
Lieutenant - 1 April 1896
Lieutenant Commander - 11 April 1902
Commander - 1 July 1907 
Captain - c. March 1911
Commodore, Retired list - 30 June 1911

See also

 Hispanics in the United States Naval Academy

References

1859 births
1936 deaths
United States Naval Academy alumni
American military personnel of the Spanish–American War
United States Navy personnel of World War I
United States Navy commodores